"The Doctor Dances" is the tenth episode of the first series in the reboot of the British science fiction television programme Doctor Who, which was first broadcast on BBC One on 28 May 2005. It is the second of a two-part story, following the broadcast of "The Empty Child" on 21 May.

The episode is set in London in 1941. In the episode, the alien time traveller the Ninth Doctor (Christopher Eccleston), his travelling companion Rose Tyler (Billie Piper), the con man Captain Jack Harkness (John Barrowman), and the homeless woman Nancy (Florence Hoath) investigate a spaceship which crashed the same time patients at a nearby hospital began turning into living dead beings with gas masks for faces.

The episode saw Jack join the Doctor as a companion. Together with "The Empty Child", it won the 2006 Hugo Award for Best Dramatic Presentation, Short Form.

Plot
The Ninth Doctor, Rose, and Jack are cornered in a London hospital during the Blitz by patients wearing gas masks fused to their faces asking for their "mummy". The Doctor pretends to be the "mummy" and orders them to go back to their room, and the patients shuffle off. Jamie, the index case of the "epidemic", also responds to this, leaving Nancy alone. The Doctor, Rose, and Jack investigate the hospital room Jamie was treated at, and learn from recordings that the child is growing stronger, and its powers may become unstoppable. Jamie arrives shortly thereafter, having returned to "his room", along with other patients. Jack teleports himself, the Doctor and Rose to Jack's spaceship. The Doctor uses the ship's Chula nanogenes to heal his wounds while learning more about Jack's past.

Nancy returns to the site where the cylinder crashed near the hospital on the night Jamie had gained his powers, only to be captured by soldiers. The Doctor, Rose, and Jack return to the site, and discover the guards' faces transforming into gas mask-wearing people, as the contagion becomes airborne. Examining the cylinder, the remains of a Chula medical ship, the Doctor deduces what has happened: as with Jack's ship, the Chula medical ship carried nanogenes. They had scanned the first human they encountered, Jamie, who died that night whilst wearing a gas mask, and presumed it was a template for all humans, transforming them into the gas mask-wearing people. Meanwhile, the transformed humans approach the cylinder. The Doctor realises that Jamie is the template controlling all these humans, searching for his "mummy", and that Nancy is not Jamie's sister but his mother. The Doctor convinces Nancy to tell Jamie she is Jamie's mother. Nancy accepts Jamie into her arms; the nanogenes determine that Nancy is Jamie's parent and that her DNA is the proper template for humans. The Doctor directs the nanogenes to undo their previous transformations, and restores Jamie to life.

A German bomb approaches the site. Jack returns to his ship and uses it to tether the bomb and steer it away from Earth. The Doctor orders everyone to flee the area, and destructs the medical ship as history recorded. Jack is unable to stop the bomb or escape from it, but the Doctor comes to rescue Jack, who joins the Doctor and Rose in the TARDIS.

Production
In the DVD commentary for this episode, writer Steven Moffat reveals that up until a very late stage, the nanogenes in this story were called "nanites". However, script editor Helen Raynor decided this name sounded too much like similar nanotechnological devices in Star Trek: The Next Generation. Moffat had first used the line "Life is just nature's way of keeping meat fresh" in the second series of his 1990s sitcom Joking Apart. He reused it here as he thought it was a good line, but laments that people quote lines from this episode instead of that one. The Chula ships are named after Chula, an Indian/Bangladeshi fusion restaurant in Hammersmith, London where the writers celebrated and discussed their briefs on the scripts they were to write for the season after being commissioned by Russell T Davies.

The climactic scene of the episode at the alien crash site was filmed on Barry Island, Wales. Several scenes of this story were filmed at the Vale of Glamorgan Railway sites at Plymouth Road on Barry Island.

Anachronistically, Jamie's voice is recorded on tape. While compact magnetic tape recorders were developed in Germany in the 1930s, the technology did not make its way to the rest of the world until after World War II. Wire recording was used by the BBC during this period, but recording gramophones, using wax discs as a medium, were more common. Steven Moffat acknowledges this mistake in the DVD commentary for "The Doctor Dances", but jokingly suggests that an ancestor of Brigadier Lethbridge-Stewart stole the machine from Germany to help with the war effort.

Broadcast and reception
"The Doctor Dances" received overnight ratings of 6.17 million viewers, a 35.9% audience share; this was the lowest figure yet for the series, but it was during a bank holiday weekend and was the most-watched programme on Saturday. It received a final rating of 6.86 million viewers. The episode received an Audience Appreciation Index score of 85.

SFX stated that the two-part story had "everything", particularly praising Moffat's script. They highlighted the ending of "The Doctor Dances" as "funny, surprising, heartwarming and life-affirming without slipping into syrupy schmaltz". Dek Hogan of Digital Spy disliked Barrowman as Captain Jack, but named the two-part story as the best episodes of the series. Arnold T Blumburg of Now Playing gave "The Doctor Dances" a grade of A, writing that it "may be the production and plotting high point of the first series to date". He said that the episode "manages to smoothly present a ton of technobabble with clarity and precision" and praised the dialogue and the "exhilarating" climax.

The scene where the child surprises the Doctor, Rose, and Jack in Room 802 was voted television's "Golden Moment of 2005" by viewers, as part of the BBC's 2005 TV Moments programme. In a poll conducted by Doctor Who Magazine in 2009, the two-part story was ranked the fifth best episode of Doctor Who. The Daily Telegraph named the story the fourth best of the show in 2008. In 2011 before the second half of the sixth series, The Huffington Post labelled "The Empty Child" and "The Doctor Dances" as one of the five essential episodes for new viewers to watch.

"The Empty Child" and "The Doctor Dances" won the 2006 Hugo Award for Best Dramatic Presentation (Short Form).

References

External links

"You got the moves? Show me your moves." — Episode trailer for "The Doctor Dances"

Doctor Who pseudohistorical serials
Hugo Award for Best Dramatic Presentation, Short Form-winning works
Ninth Doctor episodes
2005 British television episodes
Television episodes written by Steven Moffat
Television episodes about World War II
Fiction set in 1941
Television episodes set in London